Love Gets a Room is a 2021 musical drama film directed by Rodrigo Cortés. Set in the Warsaw ghetto, it stars Clara Rugaard and Ferdia Walsh-Peelo.

Plot 
Set in the Warsaw ghetto during World War II, the fiction focuses on a group of Jewish thespians performing a musical stage play.

Cast 

 Jack Roth as Jozek
 Freya Parks as Niusia
 Anastasia Hille as Irena
 Magnus Krepper as Sergeant Szkop 
 Henry Goodman as Zylberman 
 Dalit Streett Tejeda as Sarah

Production 
The screenplay was penned by David Safier and Rodrigo Cortés. Nostromo Pictures' Adrián Guerra and Núria Valls were credited as producers. The film was produced by Nostromo Pictures alongside Love Gets a Room AIE with the collaboration of the Departament of Culture of the Generalitat of Catalonia and the participation of TVC and Crea SGR.

Release 
The film made its world premiere at the 18th Seville European Film Festival (SEFF) in November 2021. Distributed by A Contracorriente Films, Love Gets a Room was theatrically released in Spain on 3 December 2021. Lionsgate handles the international sales.

Reception 
Reviewing for Fotogramas, Blai Morell gave the film 4 out of 5 stars, highlighting the "virtuosity" of its mise-en-scène and the musical compositions by Víctor Reyes, while noting that there was some performer who was not up to the task.

Raquel Hernández Luján of HobbyConsolas gave the film 80 out of 100 points, deeming it to be a cinema masterclass by Cortés, "thrilling and captivating" in terms of both the mise-en-scène and its honesty, praising the production design and the actors' direction, while noting that there were some repetitive moments and some over-abuse of the musical score.

Oti Rodríguez Marchante of ABC gave it a positive review with a rating of 4 out of 5 stars.

Reviewing for El Periódico de Catalunya, Beatriz Martínez rated the film with 4 out of 5 stars, considering that, in this film, Cortés' virtuosity was put at the service of something more than a mere stylistic exercise.

Jonathan Holland of ScreenDaily considered the result of the juxtaposition of a musical comedy stage performance and the desperate offstage lives of the fictional cast to be "a fine technical achievement, a moving enquiry into what young love can mean under such conditions, and Cortés' strongest film since 2010's Buried", also deeming it to be, from a technical point of view, "a tour-de-force in several ways".

Awards and nominations 

|-
|align = "center" rowspan = "15" | 2022 || rowspan = "3" | 9th Feroz Awards || Best Director || Rodrigo Cortés ||  || rowspan = "3" | 
|-
| Best Screenplay || David Safier, Rodrigo Cortés || 
|-
| Best Original Score || Víctor Reyes ||  
|-
| rowspan = "7" | 77th CEC Medals || colspan = "2" | Best Film ||  || rowspan = "7" | 
|-
| Best Director || Rodrigo Cortés || 
|-
| Best Actress || Clara Rugaard || 
|-
| Best Original Screenplay || Rodrigo Cortés, David Safier || 
|-
| Best Cinematography || Rafael García || 
|-
| Best Editing || Rodrigo Cortés || 
|-
| Best Score || Víctor Reyes || 
|-
| rowspan = "2" | 36th Goya Awards || Best Costume Design || Alberto Valcárcel ||  || rowspan = "2" | 
|-
| Best Production Supervision || Óscar Vigiola|| 
|-
| rowspan = "2" | 14th Gaudí Awards || Best Art Direction || Laia Colet ||  || rowspan = "2" | 
|-
| Best Costume Design || Alberto Valcárcel || 
|-
| 66th Sant Jordi Awards || colspan = "2" | Best Spanish Film ||  || 
|}

See also 
 List of Spanish films of 2021
 List of British films of 2021

References

External links
 

2020s musical drama films
Films about Jews and Judaism
Films set in Warsaw
English-language Spanish films
2021 films
2020s romantic musical films
Nostromo Pictures films
2020s English-language films
2020s Spanish films
2020s British films